Charles Arthur Hudson (19 December 1866 – 1 May 1937) was an Australian lawyer and politician who was a member of the Legislative Assembly of Western Australia from 1905 to 1921. He served as a minister in the governments of Henry Lefroy and Hal Colebatch.

Early life
Hudson was born in Geelong, Victoria, to Annie (née Nicholson) and Charles George Hudson. He left school at the age of 12, working as a printer's devil, and eventually began training as a lawyer. Hudson was admitted to the Victorian bar in 1892, and subsequently worked in various country towns, including Shepparton, Morwell, Victoria, Traralgon, and Terang. He moved to Western Australia in the early 1900s, and began practising at Norseman on the Eastern Goldfields.

Politics
Hudson entered parliament at the 1905 state election, winning the seat of Dundas for the Labor Party. He was re-elected in 1908, but prior to the 1911 election decided to transfer to the neighbouring seat of Yilgarn. Hudson defeated the sitting member, Austin Horan, for Labor preselection, and also defeated Horan (standing as an independent) in the general election. He was re-elected in 1914, to what was considered a safe Labor seat.

After the Labor Party split of 1916, Hudson joined the National Labor Party. He was made a minister without portfolio when Henry Lefroy became premier in June 1917, and the following month replaced John Scaddan (another Labor defector) as Minister for Mines and Minister for Railways, following Scaddan's defeat at a ministerial by-election. In April 1919, when Lefroy was replaced as premier by Hal Colebatch, Hudson was retained in the ministry and became Colonial Secretary. However, he served in the position for only a month, as Colebatch was quickly replaced by James Mitchell (who did not keep him on as a minister). Hudson lost his seat to Edwin Corboy of the Labor Party at the 1921 state election.

Later life
After leaving parliament, Hudson practised law at Albany for a period, and then moved to Perth. He was confined to a nursing home in Subiaco for the last years of his life, dying there in 1937, aged 70. Hudson had married Jane Ellen Wiggins in 1892, although they had no children. He was widowed in 1927.

References

1866 births
1937 deaths
Australian Labor Party members of the Parliament of Western Australia
19th-century Australian lawyers
National Labor Party members of the Parliament of Western Australia
Members of the Western Australian Legislative Assembly
Politicians from Geelong
20th-century Australian lawyers